The Gilbert Betjemann Prize (originally the Gilbert R. Betjemann Prize, also referred to as the Gilbert Betjemann Medal) is a gold medal awarded by the Royal Academy of Music (RA) "for operatic singing".

The award was founded in 1897 by G.H. Betjemann HonRA, to commemorate his son Gilbert Richard Betjemann, who was an associate and former student of the Academy and who had died following the collapse of a snow bridge over which he was walking near Grindelwald in the Bernese Alps on 9 September 1896.

In 1948 it was described as:

In 2013, the great-nephew of the 1909 recipient, Margaret Ismay, showed her medal on an episode of the BBC's Antiques Roadshow. She had had it converted into a coin watch by Cartier.

The Gilbert Betjemann Memorial Prize is a registered charity in England and Wales with number 310007.

Recipients 

The first 49 recipients are listed on a wooden prize board, with gold lettering, in the collection of the Academy. They were:

References 

Royal Academy of Music
Music competitions in the United Kingdom
Singing competitions
Opera-related lists